Igder may refer to:
 Igder-e Olya
 Igder-e Sofla
 Shahrak-e Igder